Elín Jóna Þorsteinsdóttir (born 30 November 1996) is an Icelandic handball player for Ringkøbing Håndbold and the Icelandic national team.

In April 2021, she signed a two-year contract with Danish Ringkøbing Håndbold. Before moving to Denmark and Vendsyssel Håndbold in the Danish 1st Division, Elin played for Haukar Handball in the Úrvalsdeild kvenna.

References

External links

1996 births
Living people
Sandra Erlingsdottir
21st-century Icelandic women
Expatriate handball players
Icelandic expatriate sportspeople in Denmark